Brackley Central was a railway station on the former Great Central Main Line which ran from Manchester Piccadilly to London Marylebone, the last main line to be built from the north of England to London.

History 

The station opened when passenger services commenced on 15 March 1899 serving the Northamptonshire town of Brackley, and was the second station in the town, following the London and North Western Railway's facility, which was known simply as Brackley. The Great Central Railway's London Extension was a victim of the Beeching Axe as it was seen as a duplicate of the Midland Main Line and after a period of rundown with lesser stations closing first, the section between Aylesbury and Rugby Central, including Brackley Central station, was closed to all traffic on 5 September 1966. The former L&NW line had closed a few years earlier.

Layout 

The station was a variation on the standard island platform design typical of the London Extension, and here it was the more common "cutting" type reached from a roadway (the A43), that crossed over the line. The cutting itself was substantial and typical of the line, involving the excavation of some 336,000 cubic yards (256,892 cubic metres) of material. The original intention was for the station entrance to be located on the bridge itself, as it was at numerous other stations on the line, but local concerns about traffic congestion forced a change in the layout, the entrance being relocated at the top of the cutting on the west side in a lay-by off the road, with a footbridge leading across to the platform  (Hucknall Central had a similar arrangement, only there the entrance was on the east side). Although the town of Brackley had a population of barely 2,500 at the time, it was considered a sufficiently large and important settlement for the station to be provided with a more extensive range of platform buildings and facilities beneath a longer awning, as at Woodford Halse and Rugby Central.

Many myths surround construction, one being that Brackley was to house a locomotive depot and workshops.

The unbuilt Northampton branch 
The early photograph of the station (dated 1906) is interesting in that it shows, on the right hand (west) side, a third platform under construction. The story is somewhat shrouded in myth but according to legend the Great Central had visions of building a branch line from Brackley via Towcester to Northampton, but never got the go-ahead; indeed, no Bill was ever presented to Parliament. Nevertheless, the branch platform was commenced anyway, but never got beyond the stage shown. Its position is a puzzle also in that it appears to be located on the "wrong side" of the station, since Northampton-bound trains would have had to cross the main running lines in order to access the branch.

Brackley Viaduct 

A little way to the south the ground level fell away rapidly so that the line found itself on a high embankment leading to Brackley Viaduct. Meanwhile, the third arch from the north end was walled up to provide extra bracing there.

Today 
Today the entrance building at road level still stands and is occupied by a cafe called Brackley Central. Down in the cutting the platform and its buildings have gone, replaced by a range of industrial units. Improvements to the A43 following the line's closure meant that the bridge carrying the road over the line was demolished and the cutting partially filled in at that point. To the south, the viaduct was demolished in sections in the spring and summer of 1978, the rubble being reused as hardcore beneath new roads in Milton Keynes.

Future 
Chiltern Railways, the rail operator between London and Aylesbury, has suggested that its long-term ambition is to open up the GCML beyond Rugby. This would include a new parkway station at Brackley and near the intersection of the M1 and M6 motorways north of Rugby.

In January 2008, Secretary of State for Transport Ruth Kelly confirmed in a statement to the House of Commons that she had an "open mind" as to whether, during the second control period from 2014, "a disused rail line between London and Birmingham" should be reopened as a means of relieving the West Coast Main Line, which was interpreted by rail commentators as referring to the GCML.

Routes

References

External links
GCR Timetables: 1957: includes scans of the original

Disused railway stations in Northamptonshire
Former Great Central Railway stations
Railway stations in Great Britain opened in 1899
Railway stations in Great Britain closed in 1966
Beeching closures in England
1899 establishments in England
Brackley